Bovina may refer to:

 Bovina, Colorado
 Bovina, Mississippi
 Bovina, New York
 Bovina, Texas
 Bovina, Wisconsin

in science:
Bovina (subtribe), a group of hoofed mammals containing bison and cattle